Zach Sieler (born September 7, 1995) is an American football defensive end for the Miami Dolphins of the National Football League (NFL). He played college football at Ferris State, and was drafted by the Baltimore Ravens in the seventh round of the 2018 NFL Draft.

Professional career

Sieler was drafted by the Baltimore Ravens in the seventh round (238th overall) of the 2018 NFL Draft.

Baltimore Ravens
On August 31, 2019, Sieler was waived by the Ravens and was signed to the practice squad the next day. He was promoted to the active roster on October 5, 2019. He was waived on December 4, 2019.

Miami Dolphins
On December 5, 2019, Sieler was claimed off waivers by the Miami Dolphins.

On April 17, 2020, Sieler was re-signed to a one-year contract by the Dolphins. He was placed on the reserve/COVID-19 list by the team on July 31, 2020, and was activated six days later.

On November 16, 2020, the Dolphins signed Sieler to a three-year contract extension through the 2023 season.

NFL career statistics

References

External links
 Ferris State Bulldogs bio
Biography at NFL.com

1995 births
Living people
American football defensive ends
Baltimore Ravens players
Ferris State Bulldogs football players
Miami Dolphins players
People from Howell, Michigan
People from Pinckney, Michigan
Players of American football from Michigan
Sportspeople from Metro Detroit